The 1970–71 Rugby Union County Championship was the 71st edition of England's premier rugby union club competition at the time. It would be the last season when the competition was viewed as the premier club competition because the following season would see the introduction of a National Knockout Competition.

Surrey won their second title after defeating Gloucestershire in the final.

First Round 

+ Won play off

Second Round

Semi finals

Final

See also
 English rugby union system
 Rugby union in England

References

Rugby Union County Championship
County Championship (rugby union) seasons